William Ashman Fraker, A.S.C., B.S.C. (September 29, 1923 – May 31, 2010) was an American cinematographer, film director and producer. He was nominated five times for the Academy Award for Best Cinematography.  In 2000, he received a Lifetime Achievement Award from the American Society of Cinematographers (ASC) honoring his career.  Fraker graduated from the USC School of Cinematic Arts in 1950.

Life and career
Fraker was born in Los Angeles, California, the son of a Hollywood studio photographer. His mother was a native of Mexico who had fled the Mexican Revolution with her family. Fraker's parents died during his childhood and he was subsequently raised by his Mexican grandmother, who instructed him in photography like she had with his father before him.

He served four years in either the U.S. Navy or the U.S. Coast Guard during World War II, seeing action in the Pacific. Fraker then attended USC under the G.I. Bill, graduating with a degree in Cinema. He was admitted into the camera union in 1954 and subsequently spent years working in television before breaking into the film industry.

As cinematographer, his films include The President's Analyst (1967), Rosemary's Baby (1968), Bullitt (1968), Paint Your Wagon (1969), The Day of the Dolphin (1973), Coonskin (1975), Looking For Mr. Goodbar (1977), Exorcist II: The Heretic (1977), Heaven Can Wait (1978), 1941 (1979), WarGames (1983), Irreconcilable Differences (1984), Murphy's Romance (1985), Tombstone (1993), and Street Fighter (1994).

He directed three theatrical films – Monte Walsh (1970), A Reflection of Fear (1971) and The Legend of the Lone Ranger (1981) – as well as episodes of several television series.

Death
Fraker died on May 31, 2010 at Cedars-Sinai Medical Center in Los Angeles after a battle with cancer. He was 86. He is survived by his wife Denise. He was predeceased in 1992 by son, William A. Fraker Jr., an assistant cameraman.

Awards
Academy Awards
Nominee Best Cinematography - Murphy's Romance (1985)
Nominee Best Cinematography - WarGames (1983)
Nominee Best Cinematography - 1941 (1979)
Nominee Best Visual Effects - 1941 (1979) (also nominated - A. D. Flowers, Greg Jein)
Nominee Best Cinematography - Heaven Can Wait (1978)
Nominee Best Cinematography - Looking for Mr. Goodbar (1977)

BAFTA
Nominee Best Visual Effects - WarGames (1983) (also nominated - Michael Fink, Joe Digeatano, Jack Cooperman, Don Hansard, Colin Cantwell)
Nominee Best Cinematography - One Flew Over the Cuckoo's Nest (1975) (also nominated - Haskell Wexler, Bill Butler)
Nominee Best Cinematography - Bullitt (1968)

American Society of Cinematographers
Winner Lifetime Achievement Award (2000)

Camerimage
Winner Lifetime Achievement Award (2003)

National Society of Film Critics
Winner Best Cinematography - Bullitt (1968)

Filmography 
Director
 Monte Walsh (1970)
 A Reflection of Fear (1970)
 The Legend of the Lone Ranger (1981)

Cinematographer

Additional photography

References

External links
 

Film producers from California
American cinematographers
American film directors of Mexican descent
1923 births
2010 deaths
USC School of Cinematic Arts alumni
Deaths from cancer in California
Film directors from Los Angeles
American television directors
United States Coast Guard personnel of World War II